UTAir Cargo is a Russian cargo airline based in Plekhanov, Tyumen and a subsidiary of Utair.

Destinations
UTair Cargo carries out aerial survey work, forest fire observation, paratrooper and charter passenger transport, and mail deliveries on behalf of DHL Aviation. It operates scheduled freight flights to Afghanistan, Azerbaijan, Tajikistan, Kazakhstan, Ukraine, Turkey, Egypt, Sudan, Bahrain, Nordholz (Germany), Liège (Belgium), Helsinki (Finland), Budapest (Hungary), Zürich (Switzerland) and Gdańsk (Poland). On 12 April 2012, UTAir Cargo also launched operations to the North Pole.

Fleet

As of June 2019, The UTair Cargo fleet consists of the following aircraft:

References

External links

Airlines of Russia
Cargo airlines of Russia
Companies based in Tyumen Oblast